Art of the Drink (AOTD) is a video podcast focusing exclusively on bartending. Each week, the show covers a drink recipe and gives viewers preparation tips.

The AOTD Video Podcast is an offshoot of the Art of the Drink Instructional Bartending DVD series. Created by writer/director/host Anthony Caporale and cinematographer/film editor David McCoy, the AOTD-VP follows a simple two-act format: first the drink is prepared by Anthony, then his co-host makes the drink following his instructions. Many episodes feature a trivia contest based on lessons from previous episodes. Each episode ends with a coda of outtakes and candid moments from the shoot.

Art of the Drink has received honors, including the Lulu TV Award for Best Instructional Vlog of 2006. AOTD was also selected as an iTunes Featured How-To Podcast. The series was featured in The News & Observer and commended as a Best of 2006 in The New York Times. Art of the Drink is produced by Lion's Cathedral Productions.

Season 1 DrinkArt Girls 
May 2006 - Ashley S.
June 2006 - Rachel K.
July 2006 - Melissa M.
August 2006 - Kat R.
September 2006 - Whitney M.

Season 2 DrinkArt Girls 
October 2006 - Julie B.
November 2006 - touring
December 2006 - Tracy S.
January 2007 - on hiatus
February 2007 - Krysta C.

Season 1 Episodes

Season 2 Episodes

References

"A Cape Cod" by Jim Kirks, The Clip Show, August 15, 2006, retrieved January 9, 2007

External links

Art of the Drink channel on Blip

2006 web series debuts
2006 web series endings
Video podcasts
Cooking web series
American podcasts
Food and drink podcasts
American non-fiction web series